Chernigovka is a rural locality (a selo) and the administrative center of Chernigovsky Selsoviet of Arkharinsky District, Amur Oblast, Russia. The population was 149 as of 2018. There are 6 streets.

Geography 
Chernigovka is located near the Trans-Baikal Railway, 30 km north of Arkhara (the district's administrative centre) by road. Domikan is the nearest rural locality.

References 

Rural localities in Arkharinsky District